What Should Not Be Unearthed is the eighth studio album by American technical death metal band Nile. The album was released on August 28, 2015 in North America through Nuclear Blast. It is the last album to feature Dallas Toler-Wade before his departure from the band in 2017.

On July 7, 2015, the album's track listing was revealed with two lyric videos being released soon after.

Track listing

Personnel
Nile
 Karl Sanders − guitars, vocals, bass, keyboards, glissentar, baglama saz
 Dallas Toler-Wade − guitars, vocals, bass
 George Kollias − drums

Additional personnel
 Pete Hammoura − percussion, vocals
 Mike Breazeale − vocals
 Brad Parris − vocals

Production
 Neil Kernon − production, mixing, engineering
 Bob Moore − drum engineering
 Alan Douches − mastering

Cover artwork
 Michał "Xaay" Loranc

Charts

References

2015 albums
Nile (band) albums
Nuclear Blast albums
Albums produced by Neil Kernon